The Palestine Cup is the main national association football competition in Palestine. It is sanctioned by the Palestinian Football Association. Past competitions were more expansive including clubs from all tiers of Palestinian football. For the 2010–11 season the PFA restricted participation to just the 12 teams of the 2010–11 West Bank Premier League.

Format
The format of the 2010–11 Palestine Cup featured a group stage with two groups of six teams. After one round of play where each team in the group had played each other once, the top two teams based on points accumulated advanced to the semifinal stage. Semifinals were a two-legged affair with the aggregate winners advancing to a one-off final.

Past winners
There are two competitions, the Gaza Strip Cup for clubs in the Gaza Strip, and the West Bank Cup for clubs in the West Bank. Since 2015, a two-legged Palestine Cup final is played between the cup winners of the Gaza Strip and the West Bank.

Gaza Strip Cup

West Bank Cup

Finals

See also
Gaza Strip Super Cup
West Bank Super Cup

References

External links
RSSSF.com

 
National association football cups
Football competitions in the State of Palestine